St. Mary's Higher Secondary School is a Higher Secondary school at Cox Colony in the Jharsuguda district of Odisha, India. It was founded in 1959 and, as of 2020, serves more than 2000 students. St Mary's Higher Secondary School is affiliated to ICSE Board and ISC. Sr. Leelamma is the present principal of the school. This school has 1 Library, 1 Physics lab, 1 Chemistry lab, 1 Biology lab and 2 computer labs. Each Classroom has a Smartboard and a projector besides other conventional things of a School Classroom. Each year the school has Investiture Ceremony where leaders of each of the 4 houses(Red, Blue, Green, Yellow), Head Boy and The Head girl and the General Monitors are felicitated. The Vedanta Group of Jharsuguda are Invited as the Chief Guest each time, who honour the ICSE School Topper and the ISC School Topper with Laptops. Every alternate years the school hosts School Function and the Sports Day.

References

External links
 Website : www.smcsjsg.org.in
 Website : ICSE Schools in India

Educational institutions established in 1959
Jharsuguda district
High schools and secondary schools in Odisha
1959 establishments in Orissa